The Conference of Addis Ababa was a meeting of the Oriental Orthodox Churches in Addis Ababa, Ethiopia from 15-21 January 1965. Hosted nominally by Abuna Basilios (head of the Ethiopian Orthodox Tewahedo Church), but effectively by Abuna Theophilos, this meeting was momentous as there had been no such collective meeting of the various Non-Chalcedonian churches since the 5th century at Ephesus. The meeting was attended by Pope Cyril VI (head of the Coptic Orthodox Church of Alexandria), Mor Ignatius Ya`qub III (head of the Syriac Orthodox Church), Vazgen I (head of the Armenian Apostolic Church), Khoren I (head of the Armenian Catholicosate of Cilicia), and Baselios Augen I (head of the Malankara Orthodox Syrian Church).

Organization 
Emperor Haile Selassie of Ethiopia first thought of the idea of the meeting, for him a way to integrate the Non-Chalcedonian churches. While Selassie initially invited both represented of Oriental Orthodox and Eastern Orthodox churches, the invitation to the latter was rescinded as Selassie wished for the Oriental Orthodox churches to discuss communion.

See also
Monophysitism
Miaphysitism

References

External links
 Addis Ababa Conference Portal (powered by the Orthodoxy Cognate PAGE)
 Addis Ababa Conference of 1965

20th-century church councils
20th-century Oriental Orthodoxy
History of Addis Ababa
1965 in Christianity
1965 in Ethiopia
20th century in Addis Ababa
1965 conferences
Oriental Orthodoxy in Ethiopia